Stilipedidae is a family of amphipods, containing the following genera:
Alexandrella
Astyra
Astyroides
Bathypanoploea
Stilipes

References

External links
Stilipedidae Holmes, 1908, Crustacea.net

Gammaridea
Crustacean families